The Cabaret Upstairs was a radio comedy programme that was broadcast on BBC Radio 4 from May 1986 to April 1988. There were 18 half-hour episodes, each showcasing a roster of material from 3 comedians or music acts (stretched to 4 or sometimes 5 in the later series). Acts included Clive Anderson, Jo Brand, Jeremy Hardy, Harry Enfield, Punt and Dennis, and it was produced and directed by David Tyler.

References

External links
Lavalie, John. "The Cabaret Upstairs",  EpGuides.

1988 radio programme debuts
BBC Radio 4 programmes